A group of pre-Vaudevillian acrobats founded in the early 1840s, the Hanlon-Lees were world-renowned practitioners of "entortillation" (an invented word based upon the French term  entortillage, which translates to "twisting" or "coiling") – that is, tumbling, juggling, and an early form of "knockabout" comedy (later popularized by such groups as the Marx Brothers and the Three Stooges). The troupe consisted of the six Hanlon brothers and their mentor, established acrobat Professor John Lees.

Originally billed as "The Hanlons," the group debuted in 1846 at London's Theatre Royal, Adelphi. At this time, the company consisted of George, William, and Alfred Hanlon, who were essentially wards of John Lees until his death in 1855. After his demise, the Hanlons returned to England and enlisted their younger brothers – Thomas, Edward, and Frederick – and rechristened themselves "The Hanlon-Lees" in honor of their fallen friend and instructor.

The newly expanded troupe made its American debut in 1858 at Niblo's Garden in New York City, and spent the next four decades touring the United States and Europe. As their skills improved, their performances became more elaborate. When Jules Léotard introduced the trapeze in 1859, for instance, the Hanlon-Lees quickly adapted to the new device; their next production, Le Voyage en Suisse (A Trip to Switzerland) contained an aerial juggling sequence that stunned Émile Zola, who expressed utter astonishment at the vast number of airborne objects.  There is a spectacular poster by Jules Chéret, the great pioneer of the classic era of French poster design, advertising their appearance at the Folies Bergères in 1878. In addition, the company is referred to in J.K. Huysmans chapter: "The Folies-Bergere in 1879" in his book Parisian Sketches, first published in France in 1880: "these side-splitting, yet funereal, clowns, the Hanlon-Lees.".

The Hanlon-Lees also patented several inventions, including the aerial safety net and a wooden brace used in the construction of scenery (which is to this day referred to as a "hanlon").

Despite the death of Thomas in 1868, the group continued to perform regularly until the early 1900s, at which point George Hanlon's sons Will and Fred assumed control of the company's repertoire. They would carry the company successfully into the 20th Century, going so far as to appear on film for Thomas Edison in a production entitled Fantasma. The Hanlons would endure for another four decades, adapting their acts for vaudeville and finally appearing in the 1945 season of the Ringling Brothers and Barnum & Bailey Circus.

In 1979, six American performers sought out the final living descendant of the original Hanlon brothers and asked for her blessing upon their new company, dubbed the Hanlon-Lees Action Theater. This modern incarnation of the original troupe is best known for pioneering and refining a theatrical form of medieval jousting, an event which the company continues to perform at Renaissance festivals in the United States. The modern day Hanlon-Lees also perform Western-themed shows such as fantasy rodeos and cowboy exhibitions.

References 
Cosdon, Mark.  (2009 and occasional updates).  "A Chronological Outline of the Hanlon Brothers, 1833 - 1931."
Cosdon, Mark.  (2009).  The Hanlon Brothers:  From Daredevil Acrobatics to Spectacle Pantomime, 1833 - 1931, Theatre in the Americas Series, Southern Illinois University Press.
Cosdon, Mark.  (2000).  "Prepping for Pantomime:  The Hanlon Brothers Fame and Tragedy, 1833- 1870.  Theatre History Studies, Volume 20 (2000):  67 - 104.
Cosdon, Mark.  (2006).  "'Serving the Purpose Amply:'"  The Hanlon Brothers 'Le Voyage en Suisse.'"  The Journal of American Drama and Theatre, Volume 18, no. 2 (Spring 2006):  71 - 100.
Huysmans, J.K. (1880)  Parisian Sketches, France, 1880. Republished by Dedalus, 2004. 
Lesclide, Richard (1880) Mémoires des Frères Hanlon Lees, Paris: Reverchon et Vollet.
McKinven, John A. (1998). The Hanlon Brothers: Their Amazing Acrobatics, Pantomimes and Stage Spectacles, David Meyer Magic Books.
Towsen, John H. (1976). Clowns, E.P. Dutton.

Acrobats
British circus performers
American circus performers